The California Criminal Syndicalism Act (Stats. 1919, c. 188, p. 281; it was codified at California Penal Code §§ 11400 et seq.) was a law of California in 1919 under Governor William Stephens criminalizing syndicalism. It was enacted on April 30, 1919, and repealed in 1991.

One of the Act's best-known convictions was that of Charlotte Anita Whitney, which led to the Act being upheld by the Supreme Court of the United States in Whitney v. California (1927), which was itself explicitly overturned in Brandenburg v. Ohio (1969), effectively declaring the Act unconstitutional.

The Act must be viewed in the context of the First Red Scare and the turbulent labor history of the United States in the early 20th century. From 1910 to 1920, 20 states enacted laws criminalizing syndicalism.

Convictions
One of the Act's best-known convictions was of Charlotte Anita Whitney in 1920, which led to the Act being upheld by the Supreme Court of the United States in Whitney v. California (1927).

In April 1930, meetings of the Agricultural Workers' Industrial League (AWIL) across Imperial Valley but centered around El Centro were raided by the Imperial County Sheriff. Of the hundreds arrested, 16 were charged by the Imperial County Grand Jury with violations of the Criminal Syndicalism Act, and 8 were convicted on 13 June 1930 and received sentences ranging from deportation to 42 years in prison. In 1931, the conviction of Frank Spector was reversed by the California Court of Appeal for the Fourth District in Fresno, California. All of the convicts were paroled by 1933.

Notes

References

 
 
 
 

Criminal Syndicalism Act
Syndicalism
1919 in law
Criminal Syndicalism Act
1991 in law
Criminal Syndicalism Act
History of labor relations in the United States
Industrial Workers of the World in California
Anti-communism in the United States
Anti-anarchism in the United States
Political repression in the United States
Censorship in the United States
Freedom of expression in the United States